Marydel is the name of two places in the United States of America (acquiring their names by being on the Maryland-Delaware border):
Marydel, Delaware
Marydel, Maryland